Network storage may refer to:

 Cloud storage
 Clustered file system
 Distributed file system
 File hosting service
 File server
 Network-attached storage
 Storage area network